All at Once is a 2014 Russian black comedy film directed by Roman Karimov.

Plot
Tim and Dan are loser friends from a provincial town. University life is behind them, they do not wish to work, there are no girls. The guys undertake to fulfill the task of a local bandit and start to work, taking with them a car mechanic Zhora, who is also a total failure. It is necessary for them to clearly stage a robbery of their own, fake drug courier. The role of the courier is accidentally given to the honest demobbed Vanya, son of the local authority – the "Persian", who obeys the local criminal authority, who is not aware of the permutations and promises.

Cast
 Nikita Ost as Vanya
 Anton Shurtsov as Tima
 Aleksandr Pal as Den
 Yulia Khlynina as Motya
 Artyom Kostyunev as Zhora
 Ilya Naishuller as The Armourer
 Sergei Pakhomov as Tima's Uncle

Awards and nominations 
 Russian National Movie Awards — Best Russian Action of the Year (nom)

References

External links 

2014 black comedy films
Russian black comedy films
Russian crime comedy films
Films directed by Roman Karimov
2010s Russian-language films